Goharbaran-e Shomali Rural District is a rural district (dehestan) in Gahrbaran District, Miandorud County, Mazandaran Province, Iran. At the 2006 census, its population was 6,258, in 1,725 families. The rural district has 10 villages.

References 

Rural Districts of Mazandaran Province
Miandorud County